Edward Tattersfield (second ¼ 1912 – death unknown) was an English professional rugby league footballer who played in the 1930s and 1940s, and coached in the 1940s. Ted Tattersfield was a Corporal in the British Army during World War II.

Background
Ted Tattersfield's birth was registered in Kingston upon Hull, East Riding of Yorkshire, England.

Playing career

International honours
Ted Tattersfield won caps for England while at Leeds in 1940 against Wales, in 1941 against Wales, in 1943 against Wales, and in 1944 against Wales.

Championship final appearances
Ted Tattersfield played left-, i.e. number 11, and scored a penalty goal in Leeds' 2–8 defeat by Hunslet in the Championship Final during the 1937–38 season at Elland Road, Leeds on Saturday 30 April 1938.

Challenge Cup Final appearances
Ted Tattersfield played  in Leeds' 19–2 victory over Halifax in the 1940–41 Challenge Cup Final during the 1940–41 season at Odsal Stadium, Bradford, in front of a crowd of 28,500, and played  in the 15–10 victory over Halifax in the 1941–42 Challenge Cup Final during the 1941–42 season at Odsal Stadium, Bradford, in front of a crowd of 15,250.

County Cup Final appearances
Ted Tattersfield played  in Leeds' 14–8 victory over Huddersfield in the 1937–38 Yorkshire County Cup Final during the 1937–38 season at Belle Vue, Wakefield on Saturday 30 October 1937.

Other notable matches
Ted Tattersfield played  for Northern Command XIII against a Rugby League XIII at Thrum Hall, Halifax on Saturday 21 March 1942.

Club career
Ted Tattersfield
transferred from Reckitt ARLFC to Hull Kingston Rovers, he transferred from Hull Kingston Rovers to Leeds, he made his initial début for Leeds against Bradford Northern at Odsal Stadium, Bradford on Saturday 30 January 1937, however this match was abandoned after , so his official début took place against Halifax at Headingley Rugby Stadium, Leeds on Saturday 6 February 1937, he played as a World War II guest from Leeds at Halifax, he transferred from Leeds to Batley during April 1945, he transferred from Batley to Hull FC.

References

External links
History : Past Players at hullfc.com
Stats → Past Players → T at hullfc.com
Statistics at hullfc.com
Search for "Ted Tattersfield" at britishnewspaperarchive.co.uk
Search for "Edward Tattersfield" at britishnewspaperarchive.co.uk

1912 births
1991 deaths
Army XIII rugby league players
Batley Bulldogs players
British Army personnel of World War II
British Army soldiers
England national rugby league team players
English rugby league coaches
English rugby league players
Halifax R.L.F.C. players
Hull F.C. coaches
Hull F.C. players
Hull Kingston Rovers players
Leeds Rhinos captains
Leeds Rhinos players
Northern Command XIII rugby league team players
Place of death missing
Rugby league locks
Rugby league second-rows
Rugby league players from Kingston upon Hull